Joyful Noise is the soundtrack album to the 2012 film of the same name, starring Queen Latifah and Dolly Parton. The soundtrack was released on January 10, 2012, by WaterTower Music and contains three original compositions by Parton. The soundtrack produced two singles; "He's Everything" and "From Here to the Moon and Back".

Track listing

Charts

Weekly charts

Year-end charts

Singles

Other charted songs

References

2012 albums